Edward Hooper Gove (July 14, 1847 – January 24, 1928) was an American politician in the state of Maine. He served as Secretary of State of Maine from 1878 to 1879.

References

1847 births
1928 deaths
Politicians from Biddeford, Maine
Maine Greenbacks
Secretaries of State of Maine
Maine lawyers
19th-century American lawyers